Shikahogh is a village in the Kapan Municipality of the Syunik Province in Armenia.

Etymology 
The name of the village originates from the term , meaning "Red land".

Demographics 
The National Statistical Service of the Republic of Armenia (ARMSTAT) reported its population was 189 in 2010, down from 272 at the 2001 census.

See also
Shikahogh State Reserve

References 

Populated places in Syunik Province